Singles Bar is a studio album from Kikki Danielsson, released in November 1983. On the album charts, the album peaked at number 13 in Norway and number 35 in Sweden. In July 2009 the album was digitally released to iTunes.

Track listing

Side A

Side B

Facts
Produced and arranged by Anders Glenmark
Recorded in "Glenstudio", Stocksund, Sweden, October 1983
Technician: Claes-Göran Persson

Contributing musicians
Song, Kikki Danielsson
drums and percussion: Magnus Persson
Keyboards: Kjell Öhman
Bass - Rutger Gunnarsson and Mats Englund
Electric guitar - Henrik Jansson and Hasse Rosén
Steel guitar - Mats Rosén
Trumpet - Urban Agnes and Leif Lindvall
Trombone - Nisse Landgren
Saxophone - Glen Myerscough
Choir - Karin Glenmark, Anders Glenmark and Lennart Sjöholm
Strings - led by Anders Dahl

Charts

References

External links

1983 albums
Kikki Danielsson albums